Antoine Song (born 18 July 1992 in Paris) is a French mathematician whose research concerns differential geometry. In 2018, he proved Yau's conjecture. He is a Clay Research Fellow (2019–2024). He obtained his Ph.D. from Princeton University in 2019 under the supervision of Fernando Codá Marques.

Existence of minimal surfaces 
It is known that any closed surface possesses infinitely many closed geodesics. The first problem in the minimal submanifolds section of Yau's list asks whether  any closed three-manifold has infinitely many closed smooth immersed minimal surfaces. At the time it was known from Almgren–Pitts min-max theory the existence of at least one minimal surface. Kei Irie, Fernando Codá Marques, and André Neves solved this problem in the generic case  and  later Antoine Song claimed it in full generality.

Selected publications
"Existence of infinitely many minimal hypersurfaces in closed manifolds" (2018)
Joint with Marques and Neves: "Equidistribution of minimal hypersurfaces for generic metrics" (2019), Inventiones mathematicae

References

Living people
Differential geometers
Princeton University alumni
1992 births
Scientists from Paris
French mathematicians